Logical depth is a measure of complexity for individual  strings devised by Charles H. Bennett based on the computational complexity of an algorithm that can recreate a given piece of information. It differs from Kolmogorov complexity in that it considers the computation time of the algorithm with nearly minimal length, rather than the length of the minimal algorithm.

Formally, in the context of some universal computer  the logical depth of a string  to significance level  is given by  the running time of the fastest program that produces  and is no more than  longer than the minimal program.

See also 
 Effective complexity
 Self-dissimilarity
 Forecasting complexity
 Sophistication (complexity theory)

References 

Information theory
Computational complexity theory
Measures of complexity